Blackpool railway station may refer to several railway stations in Blackpool, England:
 Blackpool North railway station, the terminus of the main Blackpool branch line from Preston
 Blackpool Central railway station (closed in 1964)
 Blackpool South railway station, the terminus of the South Fylde Line from Kirkham and Wesham
 Blackpool Pleasure Beach railway station, the penultimate station before Blackpool South on the Blackpool South to Colne line